The Party of United Pensioners, Farmers, and Proletarians of Serbia – Solidarity and Justice (abbr. PUPS – Solidarity and Justice) is a political party in Serbia that advocates for pensioners' interests.

Initially known as Party of United Pensioners of Serbia (PUPS) until June 2022, the party was founded in 2005 by Jovan Krkobabić and former members of the Socialist Party of Serbia, they were a part of the SPS-led coalition between 2008 and 2016 and since 2016 they have been a part of the SNS-led coalition. It is currently led by Milan Krkobabić, who has been the president since 2014. It also maintains socially conservative views.

History

Formation and early history 
The party was registered on 10 May 2005 by Jovan Krkobabić and other pensioners who were previously members of the Socialist Party of Serbia (SPS) and its predecessor League of Communists of Serbia (SKS). They participated in the 2007 parliamentary election in a coalition with the Social Democratic Party that was led by Nebojša Čović and the Socialist People's Party. The coalition ended up getting 3.11% of the vote which at the time wasn't enough to enter the National Assembly. In early 2008, they formed a coalition with SPS and United Serbia (JS) to participate in the 2008 parliamentary election. The coalition placed fourth, winning 7.58% of the vote and 20 seats in the National Assembly while PUPS won 5 of the 20 coalition seats.

Elections with SPS-JS coalition 
The SPS-PUPS-JS coalition formed a coalition government with the Democratic Party (DS) and Jovan Krkobabić then became the Deputy Prime Minister of Serbia, a role he would serve until his death in 2014. Their coalition placed third in the 2012 parliamentary election with 14.51% of the vote and 44 seats and PUPS gained 7 more seats. Jovan Krkobabić continued to serve his term as the Deputy Prime Minister after the formation of SNS-SPS government. In 2014, they participated again with the SPS-JS coalition and they placed second with 13.49% of the vote and 44 seats in the National Assembly.

SNS coalition and modern period 
In 2016, the presidency of PUPS signed an agreement with SNS to join its pre-election coalition. The SNS-led coalition placed first with 48.25% of the vote and 131 seats in the parliament while PUPS lost 3 seats. The president of PUPS, Milan Krkobabić then became the Minister without portfolio. In 2020, they participated again with the SNS-led coalition which won 60.65% of the vote and 188 seats while PUPS' number of seats didn't change. Krkobabić was then appointed as the Minister of Rural Welfare.

Presidents

Electoral performance

Parliamentary elections

Presidential elections

References

External links
Official website

2005 establishments in Serbia
Social conservative parties
Pensioners' parties
Political parties established in 2005